Sven Sester (born 14 July 1969) is an Estonian politician and former Minister of Finance.

Early life
Sester was born on 14 July 1969 in Tallinn, Estonia. After graduating from high school in 1987, he studied Economics and Information Technology at the Tallinn University of Technology.

Business career
From 1990 to 1991 he worked for the Mainor Centre for Public Opinion Research as data processing specialist. From 1991 to 1992 he was a manager for the Selected Daily Mail Joint Enterprise. From 1992 to 1999 he worked for ERI Real Estate Ltd in management. Later he became chairman of the board at Baltic Real Investments plc. From 2003 to 2005 he served as chairman of the supervisory board of Eesti Loto. He has been a member of the management board of Roosikrantsi Hotell Ltd. since 2007. Sester is currently president of the Estonian Tournament Bridge League, member of board of Lions Club Tallinn VIA and vice president of the Association of Estonian Small and Medium Businesses.

Political career
In 1999, Sester joined Pro Patria and Res Publica Union. From 2002 to 2003, he was deputy chairman of the financial committee in Tallinn city council. From 2003 to 2007, as a member of Riigikogu he was deputy chairman of the economic affairs committee. In 2009 he worked in the economic affairs committee and then became chairman of the financial committee of parliament. He serves as a board member of his party.

In 2015 parliamentary election, Sester lost his seat in the parliament. There was confusion over the results, as after the initial vote count, fellow IRL candidate Viktoria Ladõnskaja was ahead Sester by one vote, but the recount put Sester ahead by one vote. Ladõnskaja asked for a second recount, which ended up with 1,393 votes for Ladõnskaja and 1,392 for Sester.

On April 9, 2015, Sester was nominated the Minister of Finance in Taavi Rõivas' second cabinet.

Other activities
 European Bank for Reconstruction and Development (EBRD), Ex-Officio Alternate Member of the Board of Governors (2015-2017)

References

1969 births
21st-century Estonian politicians
Finance ministers of Estonia
Government ministers of Estonia
Living people
Members of the Riigikogu, 2003–2007
Members of the Riigikogu, 2007–2011
Members of the Riigikogu, 2011–2015
Members of the Riigikogu, 2015–2019
Members of the Riigikogu, 2019–2023
Politicians from Tallinn
Isamaa politicians
Tallinn University of Technology alumni